While Lucie Hradecká and Renata Voráčová were the defending champions, Voráčová chose not to participate, and only Hradecká competed that year.
Hradecká partnered with Andrea Hlaváčková, and won in the final 6–3, 6–3, against Sesil Karatantcheva and Nataša Zorić.

Seeds

Draw

Draw

External links
Draw

Doubles
Gastein Ladies
Gast
Gast